"Missing Link" is the seventh episode of the first series of Space: 1999.  The screenplay was written by Edward di Lorenzo; the director was Ray Austin.  The final shooting script is dated 5 April 1974.  Live-action filming took place Monday 22 April 1974 through Thursday 9 May 1974, with one day of second-unit filming on 22 July 1974.

Story 
As the Moon travels through a dense planetary cluster, Moonbase Alpha's sensors show the system to be devoid of life.  A survey mission for mineral resources is launched, crewed by Victor Bergman, Sandra Benes and Alan Carter, with John Koenig commanding.  Approaching a purple-coloured world, Eagle One is suddenly yanked down by a tremendous force, as if the planet's gravity had increased.  After blasting free, the Commander aborts the mission.  While returning to Alpha, the ship experiences a complete systems failure.  Powerless, the Eagle tumbles toward the Moon.

As Koenig and company try to regain control, the ship skims over jagged terrain to belly-flop into the deep dust of a large crater.  While the ship remains intact, the crew is not as fortunate; a battered Koenig is left sprawled over the flight controls, forehead gashed and bleeding, his medical wrist-monitor smashed by the impact.  In Alpha's Medical Section, vital signs are being received from only three of the team; Doctor Helena Russell agonises over the lack of telemetry from Koenig's monitor.

Computer pinpoints the crash site in a crater over one hundred miles from the base and a rescue Eagle is prepared for immediate lift-off.  On the lunar surface, Koenig, clad in space gear, is making for Alpha on foot.  Spotting the ship as it flies overhead, he tries to attract its attention.  When he goes unnoticed, he continues on.  On Eagle One, Carter awakens.  Seeing the injured Koenig beside him, he feels for and finds a weak pulse.  He moves into the passenger module to find Bergman in pain from fractured ribs and Sandra unconscious from head trauma.

Ten minutes later, the Koenig seen walking arrives at Alpha and enters via the west airlock.  When he removes his helmet, the viewer can see his forehead is unmarked.  Moving into the base, he finds it deserted.  In search of Helena, he passes through the darkened corridors leading to the diagnostic unit.  The room is empty...except for fleeting, subliminal appearances of an alien man.  Moving to the 'scopes displaying the vital signs of the survey team, he is disturbed to see his readings are flat-lined.  Sensing movement behind him, he turns and beholds a young woman—who promptly vanishes.

The rescue Eagle arrives at the crash site.  After examining the wounded, Helena determines Koenig should not be moved unnecessarily.  Carter orders a cargo Eagle dispatched.  He plans on separating the command module with Koenig inside and having it carried back to Moonbase.  On the deserted Alpha, the uninjured Koenig enters an empty Main Mission.  Switching on the big screen, he is startled by the visual of a magnificent alien city of improbable form and dancing light.  Then, the room begins spinning around him, ever faster until reality itself seems to blur...

...and he finds himself in a featureless orange void. From a swirling mist of light, an ageless humanoid man (the alien fleetingly seen earlier) appears, welcoming Koenig to the planet Zenno. Unconvinced, the Commander tells the alien that Computer reported this system to be lifeless; the Zennite replies their primitive machine reported that fallacy because he ordered it to.  At an evolutionary state some two million years beyond present-day Earthmen, the Zennites possess awesome mental abilities.  Anything desired can be created with their minds; for instance, the dwelling around them is fashioned from light.The being finally introduces himself as Raan...and informs Koenig he, too, is human.  Raan assures the flabbergasted Koenig this is not a dream.  He was instantaneously transported to Zenno from the crashed Eagle; his trek across the lunar surface and explorations of the deserted Alpha were illusions.  He shows the Commander his wounded doppelgänger being tended by Helena on the real Moonbase.  They are joined by Raan's daughter, Vana (the woman briefly glimpsed on the faux-Alpha). Although pleasant, Koenig finds the aliens somewhat lacking in emotion.When his hosts insist on making Koenig more comfortable, a duplicate of the Commander's quarters on Alpha appears around them.  Here, the aliens inform Koenig he is to consider himself a permanent guest.  Raan, this planet's foremost anthropologist, wishes to learn about the mind of 'primitive' humanity firsthand.  On Zenno, Koenig is considered the missing link.  A sympathetic Vana later brings him food and suggests he resign himself to the situation.  Koenig is appalled, arguing that being held here against his will for scientific research makes him little more than an experimental animal.The girl, confused by the comparison, insists her father is an ethical scientist.  As the Zennites have evolved beyond negative emotions, she promises Koenig he will come to no harm—but he will remain here for the rest of his life.  Flinging the food aside, Koenig vows to starve himself to death.  Unseen, Raan watches their by-play with interest.  After she leaves, the first experiment begins.  Koenig awakens in what seems to be Alpha's Medical Centre.  Comforted by Bergman's presence at his bedside, he believes the Zenno experience was a dream.Something is amiss:  after telling him Sandra died in the crash, the professor launches into a defeatist diatribe.  Startled by the man's uncharacteristic pessimism, Koenig realises the true nature of this experience and Raan says him to listen to Victor as he tries to use a computer—then is attacked by a gang of grotesque humanoids, all victims of horrific medical experiments—then is in the centre of a frigid void, strapped in an Eagle pilot seat and draped in cobwebs.  He sees Bergman is running toward him, but the older man makes no headway.  Koenig screams as he feels himself receding into non-existence...Afterward, Raan communes with a ghost-like Zennite colleague.  He is fascinated by the emotions he has observed, especially the violence.  The other Zennite suggests Raan neutralise Koenig's mind, lest the Earthman prove to be a danger.  Raan refuses; the subject's actions must be genuine, else the experiments are valueless.  Vana again visits Koenig in his 'quarters', concerned for his well being as he continues his hunger strike.  She is obviously attracted to him and he subtly encourages her—hoping that he can use her feelings to his advantage.In its passage through the Cryton solar system, the Moon is now close to the purple planet Zenno.  The Koenig-image's condition is steadily worsening.  Desperate, Helena employs a modified electro-convulsive therapy to jolt him out of this inexplicable coma.  The repeated shocks send him into cardiac arrest, but she manages to resuscitate him.  While her staff places him on life-support, Helena privately expresses her despair.Vana confronts her father, declaring they have no right to exploit Koenig.  When asked if she would prefer the Earthman sent back to the Moon, she cannot answer—her burgeoning love clouds her judgment.  Sensing Koenig's thoughts on her, she goes to him.  She is melancholy and Koenig picks up on her mood.  To his surprise, she asks him to stay with her.  Touched by her feelings, he replies with a soft, lingering kiss (which may or may not be part of his plan to seduce her).  Eavesdropping, Raan is visibly upset by this unexpected turn of events.Morale on Alpha is at an all-time low as the Koenig-image's life apparently hangs in the balance.  Helena sits by his bedside in Medical.  Emotionally drained, she has come to the conclusion this may be his time to die.  From the next bed, Sandra, recovering from head surgery, pleads with her to wait a while longer before terminating the Commander's life-support.Koenig and Vana hold each other and gaze upon the Zenno city, contemplating a life together in this perfect world.  When Raan interrupts, Vana announces that she and Koenig are to be joined as one.  The once emotionless Raan is beside himself at the idea of his daughter in love with what, to him, is essentially a laboratory animal.  He asks the Earthman if he dares to span two million years of evolution.  Having achieved his goal of creating discord in Raan's household, Koenig is torn.  He realises that, over the course of his deception, he has genuinely fallen in love with the Zenite girl.  With complete conviction, he voices his intention of staying with Vana.As the Koenig-image remains comatose, the Alpha community becomes ill-tempered and quarrelsome.  Bergman referees a heated discussion between Carter and Paul Morrow.  Without Koenig's leadership, Morrow argues, the base is unravelling; someone must step up and fill the void.  Carter proclaims that, as long as he is breathing, Koenig is still the commander.  On Zenno, Raan interrupts the lovers by bringing another visitor to his home:  Sandra.  Vana is distressed by her father's attempts to separate her and Koenig.  Raan goes one step further when he tells Koenig his 'image' on Alpha is dying—ending any chance of returning there.  He must make a choice now.Koenig will not abandon his people.  Vana pledges to go with him, but he tells her she must remain here, in her place and time.  Devastated, she dematerialises, beseeching him not to forget her.  Raan sees Koenig off, telling him that, despite the failure of his experiment, he did learn something.  While Man wallows in emotion, Zennites are straitjacketed by logic.  He now believes it is the perfect balance between these opposing poles—'Heart' and 'Mind'—that both their peoples must aspire to attain.  Perhaps the legacy of Koenig's visit will be the revival of emotion on Zenno.  The scientist then bids Koenig farewell.Helena has decided.  Her love for Koenig will no longer allow her to prolong his suffering.  As she reaches to switch off the life-support apparatus, Carter bursts into the diagnostic unit and flings her hand aside.  Bob Mathias' attempt to calm the astronaut leads to an all-out brawl, which ends with Carter pinned against a wall by Security.  The assembled staff is respectfully silent as a tearful Helena throws the switch.  The machines shut down and the Koenig-image's vital signs flat-line...

...just as the real Koenig seamlessly assumes its place.  He shocks everyone by opening his eyes and reaching out to Helena.  Dumbfounded, she desperately clutches his hand, grateful for the miracle that has brought him back to her...

 Cast 

 Starring 
 Martin Landau — Commander John Koenig
 Barbara Bain — Doctor Helena Russell

 Also Starring 
 Barry Morse — Professor Victor Bergman

 Guest Artist 
 Joanna Dunham — Vana

 Special Guest Star 
 Peter Cushing — Raan

 Featuring 
 Prentis Hancock — Controller Paul Morrow
 Clifton Jones — David Kano
 Zienia Merton — Sandra Benes
 Anton Phillips — Doctor Bob Mathias
 Nick Tate — Captain Alan Carter

 Uncredited Artists 
 Suzanne Roquette — Tanya
 Patrick Brock — Zenite Scientist
 June Bolton — June

 Music 

In addition to the regular Barry Gray score (drawn primarily from "Breakaway" and "Another Time, Another Place"), a music track from the earlier Gerry Anderson productions Joe 90 and Stingray, also composed by Gray, was utilised.  The electronic-organ composition used as 'Vana's Theme' was a discarded track written by Gray and Alan Willis; it was originally intended to be played over establishing shots of Moonbase Alpha in 'Breakaway' and subsequent episodes.  The script specified that the love theme from Richard Wagner's opera Tristan and Isolde would play during scenes between Koenig and Vana, but this was never done.

 Production Notes 

 The second of two scripts penned by American script editor Edward di Lorenzo during his short tenure on the series, "Missing Link" is an abstract love story loosely based on William Shakespeare's play The Tempest.  Unhappy with the rewrites dictated by the New York ITC office (which was vetting every story document and script draft after their displeasure with the original cut of "Black Sun"), di Lorenzo left the series to work on his novel White Light.
 Several sequences found in the script were filmed, but cut for time: (1) The hook, where the survey mission was for minerals detected on the Moon, not an alien planet.  This sequence would be re-mounted in July by the second unit; (2) The fact that Vana was 218 years old and Raan 507; (3) Much of the subtle evidence that Koenig's romance with Vana was initially a deception; (4) Comments by both Zenites that their emotions toward Koenig rendered them incapable of reading his mind.  In the 'This Episode' montage, two cut scenes were used: (1) Koenig, Raan and Vana transporting from the orange void to the image of Koenig's quarters and (2) Sandra stumbling across the diagnostic unit as Raan begins to transport her to Zenno.
 Peter Cushing was familiar face in both Britain and America due to his many appearances in Hammer 'Horror' films, playing Victor Frankenstein and Abraham van Helsing.  Other roles included Sherlock Holmes and Dr. Who (not to be confused with the Doctor from Doctor Who) in two cinematic adaptations of the BBC series.  In 1977, he would receive international exposure as the evil Grand Moff Tarkin in George Lucas' science-fiction blockbuster Star Wars.
 Production designer Keith Wilson made a final modification to the Main Mission set before this episode.  David Kano would be given a workstation set atop a Lazy Susan-style platform.  Situated in the centre of the existing desks, he could now be easily included in most camera set-ups.  Before this, Clifton Jones was always standing off to one side by the computer banks.  The platform was designed to be manually rotated by hidden stagehands, who were more than once accidentally trod upon by the actors.  This was also the first appearance of the 'survey Eagle' modification to the passenger module set.
 There is a misspelling of Koenig's last name on a computerized scanner as "Keonig" instead of "Koenig;" this was obviously a production error that apparently failed to be noticed by the producers.

 Novelisation 

The episode was adapted in the third Year One Space: 1999 novel The Space Guardians by Brian Ball, published in 1975.  Ball's adaptation is true to the story, but some liberties are taken: (1) The original premise of the survey mission searching for a mineral deposit on the Moon is retained; (2) During Raan's first experiment, Koenig's encounter with the faux''-Bergman is much longer; Koenig is told the mineral deposit was actually a buried alien vessel.  When visiting the vessel, 'Bergman' proposes abandoning the Alphans to return home, prompting Koenig to realise the situation is not real;(3) The discord on Alpha is more graphically represented by an armed technician threatening Morrow in Main Mission, and a crowd rioting outside the diagnostic unit.

References

External links 
Space: 1999 - "Missing Link" - The Catacombs episode guide
Space: 1999 - "Missing Link" - Moonbase Alpha's Space: 1999 page

1976 British television episodes
Space: 1999 episodes